The , or  (English: Nannerl's Music Book) is a book in which Leopold Mozart, from 1759 to about 1764, wrote pieces for his daughter, Maria Anna Mozart (known as "Nannerl"), to learn and play. His son Wolfgang also used the book, in which his earliest compositions were recorded (some penned by his father). The book contains simple short keyboard (typically harpsichord) pieces, suitable for beginners; there are many anonymous minuets, some works by Leopold, and a few works by other composers including Carl Philipp Emanuel Bach and the Austrian composer Georg Christoph Wagenseil. There are also some technical exercises, a table of intervals, and some modulating figured basses. The notebook originally contained 48 bound pages of music paper, but only 36 pages remain, with some of the missing 12 pages identified in other collections. Because of the simplicity of the pieces it contains, the book is often used to provide instruction to beginning piano players.

Description of the 
Inscribed with the words Pour le clavecin (French: For the harpsichord), it was presented to Nannerl on the occasion of her eighth name day on 26 July 1759 (or possibly her eighth birthday, which fell on the 30th or 31st day of the same month). Over the course of the next four years or so, the notebook was gradually filled with pieces written out by Leopold and two or three anonymous Salzburg copyists. Wolfgang is thought to have written out four pieces. Curiously none of the pieces were inscribed by Nannerl herself.

In later years, twelve individual pages were removed from the notebook for one reason or another. Of these, four are now considered lost, but the remaining eight have been identified by Alan Tyson:
two pages in the Bibliothèque Nationale, Paris;
one in the Museum Carolino Augusteum, Salzburg;
two in the Pierpont Morgan Library, New York City;
one in the Leipzig University Library, Leipzig;
one survives only as a facsimile and consists of the opening measures of K. 5b;
one, now in a private collection, consists of a single leaf containing the rest of K. 5b.

The four lost pages have been tentatively reconstructed using a variety of other sources (Nannerl's letters and Georg Nissen's biography of Mozart). It is believed that in its completed state the  contained a total of 64 pieces (including exercises and unfinished compositions), of which 52 are in the surviving 36 pages of the book.

In addition to Leopold and Wolfgang, three anonymous scribes from Salzburg – known as Anonymous I, Anonymous II and Anonymous III – have been identified.

The  provides evidence of the collaboration between the young Wolfgang and his father. For example, number 48 is an arrangement of the third movement of Leopold's D major serenade, but the trio also appears as Menuet II in Wolfgang's Sonata K. 6.

The  is also useful in providing evidence of Leopold's approach to teaching music. The tables of intervals show that he taught music theory to his children from the start. It seems that he also taught composition from the outset, by means of a given bass line, a melody to be varied, a melody to be continued, and a structural model.

The earliest compositions by Wolfgang are written in Leopold's hand; the father's gentle suggestions for amendments came later.

Wolfgang Mozart's compositions in the book
The  contains the following pieces by Wolfgang:

Andante in C, K. 1a

This piece of music was probably Mozart's first composition. It is an extremely short piece, consisting of just 10 measures, and was notated by the composer's father, Leopold, as Wolfgang was only five years old when he composed it.

It is normally performed on the harpsichord and is in the key of C. The piece opens with a one-bar phrase in  time, which is then repeated. A second, modified phrase receives the same treatment. The piece concludes with a simple authentic cadence.

Allegro in C, K. 1b

An extremely short work, consisting of only twelve measures. It was notated by Mozart's father, Leopold, as Wolfgang was only five years old when he composed it.

It is normally performed on the harpsichord, and is in the key of C. As the tempo indicates, it is a fast and lively piece. Unlike K. 1a, this piece is not based on repeated phrases. It begins with an ascending scale in the right hand from the dominant (G) to the mediant (E) on the first and third beats of the bars, while the left hand adds a counterpoint on the off beats. After reaching a peak, the right hand drops down in a series of quarter notes and eighth notes, accompanied by a very simple bass part. Curiously, the final cadence takes place between the eighth and ninth measures: in the last four measures, which make up a quarter of the entire composition, Mozart rings various changes on an unadorned C major triad.

Allegro in F, K. 1c

This piece, Allegro for keyboard in F, K. 1c runs to twenty-four measures (including repeats). It was composed by Wolfgang on 11 December 1761 in Salzburg. It was notated by Mozart's father, Leopold, as Wolfgang was just five years old at the time.

This piece was written for the harpsichord and is usually performed on that instrument today, though other keyboard instruments may be used. This Allegro is Mozart's earliest extant piece in F major. Like K. 1b, it is in a fast tempo. It is in rounded binary form, with repeat signs at the end of each of the sections: ||:A:||:BA:||, where A and B each consists of four bars. The music is simple and classical in style. This piece has been compared to a "jolly south German folkdance".

Minuet in F, K. 1d

The minuet in F is a very short piece (around a minute in length) in extended binary form. The first section is just eight measures long and the second section twelve; both are marked with repeat signs. K. 1d was notated by Leopold Mozart; Wolfgang was five years old when he composed this piece.

It was written for the harpsichord and is usually performed on that instrument, though other keyboard instruments may be used. This dance is Mozart's earliest extant composition in minuet form. As a minuet it is, by definition, stately in feeling and written in  time.

It comprises several phrases each beginning with chords, after which broken chords and triplets are used.

Minuet in G, K. 1e

Another short piece, of 18 measures, it was probably notated by his father, Leopold Mozart, since Wolfgang was five or six years old at the time.

It was written for the harpsichord and is hence usually performed on the harpsichord, though other keyboard instruments may be used. This minuet in G major is in Mozart's first collection of works. As a minuet, it is relatively fast in  time. Unlike K. 1d, it is far less influenced by the baroque style.

It is largely constructed of phrases which are repeated: every two bars is announced by a descending fifth, after which 4 chords are played, a tune is constructed within this restraint. Each phrase is 8 bars long. In two part harmony, it consists of 3 sections: the opening, a contrasting trio, and reprise of the original.

Minuet in C, K. 1f

A short piece (around a minute in length); it was probably notated by his father, Leopold, since Wolfgang was only five or six years old at the time.

It was written for the harpsichord and is hence usually performed on the harpsichord, though other keyboard instruments may be used. This minuet is in Mozart's first collection of works. As a minuet it is relatively fast in  time. It is, unlike K. 1d far less influenced by the baroque style.

It is largely constructed of phrases which are repeated: every two bars is announced by a descending fifth, after which 4 chords are played, a tune is constructed within this restraint. Each phrase is 8 bars long. In two part harmony, it consists of 3 sections: the opening, contrasting trio, and a reprise of the original. It was, in Köchel's first catalogue listed as K. 1 along with Minuet in G, K. 1e.

Minuet in F, K. 2
A very short work (around a minute in length); it was most likely notated by his father, Leopold, as Wolfgang was only five or six years old at the time. The entry for this work was composed in Salzburg in January 1762.

It was written for the harpsichord and is hence usually performed on the harpsichord, though other keyboard instruments may be used.

This piece is a single bar motif which is developed into an eight-bar exposition, which is repeated, and then modulated for another eight bars before being repeated again.

Allegro in B-flat, K. 3
A very short, yet lively piece (around a minute in length); it was most likely notated by his father, Leopold, as Wolfgang was six years old at the time. The entry for this work states it was composed in Salzburg on 4 March 1762.

It was written for the harpsichord and is hence usually performed on the harpsichord, though other keyboard instruments may be used.

Minuet in F, K. 4
A short minuet (around a minute in length); it was most likely notated by his father, Leopold, as Wolfgang was six years old at the time. The entry for this work states it was composed in Salzburg on 11 May 1762.

It was written for the harpsichord and is hence usually performed on the harpsichord, though other keyboard instruments may be used.

Minuet in F "Triolen-Menuett", K. 5
The entry for this work states it was composed in Salzburg on 5 July 1762.

It was written for the harpsichord and is hence usually performed on the harpsichord, though other keyboard instruments may be used.

Klavierstück in C, K. 5a
A longer piece (around double the amount of time compared to that of other entries in the ); the first piece in the book to be inscribed by the young Wolfgang. The entry date for this work states it was composed in Salzburg, sometime during 1764; the precise date is not known.

It was written for the harpsichord and is hence usually performed on the harpsichord, though other keyboard instruments may be used.

Andante in B-flat, K. 5b

Estimated to be composed in Salzburg, around 1764.

It runs for 61 measures (including repeats) and usually performed on the Harpsichord, though other keyboard instruments may be used.

Table of contents

Notes

References
 Eisen, Cliff, Mozart Studies 2, Oxford University Press, 1998, 
 Eisen, Cliff and Keefe, Simon P., The Cambridge Mozart Encyclopedia, Cambridge University Press, 2006, 
 Kenyon, Nicholas, The Faber Pocket Guide to Mozart, Faber and Faber Ltd. (2005), 
 Plath, Wolfgang, Neue Mozart-Ausgabe, Series IX/27: Klavierstücke, Band (Die Notenbücher) (1982)
 Sadie, Stanley, Mozart; The Early years 1756-1781, Oxford University Press (2006), 
 Tyson, Alan, "A Reconstruction of Nannerl Mozart's Music Book (Notenbuch)" in Music & Letters, vol. 60, no. 4 (October 1979), pp. 389–400

Further reading
 , Die Notenbücher der Mozarts als Grundlage der Analyse von W. A. Mozarts Kompositionen 1761-1767, Bärenreiter-Verlag Kassel, 2007, online at www.mozartforschung.de

External links

Early keyboard works by Wolfgang Amadeus Mozart
1760s works